William Vangimembe Lukuvi (born 15 August 1955) is a Tanzanian CCM politician and Member of Parliament for Ismani constituency. Until 8 January 2022, he was the Minister for Lands, Housing and Human Settlement Development. He completed Master of Arts in political science at Open University of Tanzania.

References

1955 births
Living people
Chama Cha Mapinduzi MPs
Tanzanian MPs 2000–2005
Tanzanian MPs 2005–2010
Tanzanian MPs 2010–2015
Tanzanian MPs 2015–2020
Tanzanian MPs 2020–2025
Government ministers of Tanzania
Open University of Tanzania alumni
People from Iringa Rural District
Tanzanian Roman Catholics